The 1962 Labour Party deputy leadership election took place on 8 November 1962, after sitting deputy leader George Brown was challenged by Harold Wilson.

Candidates
 George Brown, incumbent Deputy Leader of the Labour Party, Member of Parliament for Belper
 Harold Wilson, Shadow Foreign Secretary, Member of Parliament for Huyton

Results

References
http://privatewww.essex.ac.uk/~tquinn/labour_party_deputy.htm 

1962
Labour Party deputy leadership election
Labour Party deputy leadership election
Labour Party deputy leadership election